Alba is the Scottish Gaelic name for Scotland. It is also, in English language historiography, used to refer to the polity of Picts and Scots united in the ninth century as the Kingdom of Alba, until it developed into the Kingdom of Scotland of the late Middle Ages following the absorption of Strathclyde and English-speaking Lothian in the 12th century. It is cognate with the Irish term  (gen. , dat. ) and the Manx term , the two other Goidelic Insular Celtic languages, as well as contemporary words used in Cornish and Welsh, both of which are Brythonic Insular Celtic languages. The third surviving Brythonic language, Breton, instead uses , meaning 'country of the Scots'. In the past, these terms were names for Great Britain as a whole, related to the Brythonic name Albion.

Etymology 

Historically, the term refers to Britain as a whole and is ultimately based on the Indo-European root for "white". The region Breadalbane (the upper part of "Alba") takes its name from it as well.

As time passed, that kingdom incorporated other territories to its south. It became re-Latinised in the High Medieval period as "Albania" (it is unclear whether it may ultimately share the same etymon as the modern Albania). This latter word was employed mainly by Celto-Latin writers, and most famously by Geoffrey of Monmouth. It was this word which passed into Middle English as Albany, although very rarely was this used for the Kingdom of Scotland, but rather for the notional Duchy of Albany. It is from the latter that Albany, the capital of the US state of New York, and Albany, Western Australia, take their names.

It also appears in the anglicised literary form of Albyn, as in Byron's Childe Harold:

And wild and high the 'Cameron's gathering' rose,
The war-note of Lochiel, which Albyn's hills
Have heard, and heard, too, have her Saxon foes

Modern uses 

BBC Alba, a television channel broadcasting mainly in Scottish Gaelic, was launched in September 2008 as a joint venture between the British Broadcasting Corporation (BBC) and Gaelic company MG Alba. A new version of Runrig's song  (originally on their album, The Cutter and the Clan) was featured on the channel's launch.

In the mid-1990s, the Celtic League started a campaign to have the word "Alba" on the Scottish football and rugby tops. Since 2005, the SFA have supported the use of Scottish Gaelic by adding  on the back of the official team strip. However, as of 2008, the SRU is still being lobbied to have  added to the national rugby union strip.

In 2007, the then Scottish Executive re-branded itself as "The Scottish Government" and started to use a bilingual logo with the Gaelic name . However, the Gaelic version from the outset had always been . The Scottish Parliament, likewise, uses the Gaelic name .

A new welcome sign on the historic A7 route into Scotland was erected in 2009, with the text .

Phrases such as  may be used as a catch-phrase or rallying cry. It was used in the movie Braveheart as William Wallace encouraged the troops at the Battle of Stirling Bridge.

In March 2021, former first minister of Scotland and leader of the SNP Alex Salmond launched the pro-independence Alba Party, set to contest the 2021 Scottish Parliament elections.

See also 
 Albanactus
 Caledonia
 Kingdom of Alba
 Scotia

References 

Medieval Scotland
Terminology of the British Isles
Scottish words and phrases